Hacıismayıllı (also, Gadzhyismailly and Gadzhi-Ismaily) is a village and municipality in the Jalilabad Rayon of Azerbaijan.  It has a population of 492.

References 

Populated places in Jalilabad District (Azerbaijan)